3936 Elst, provisional designation , is a stony Vestian asteroid from the inner regions of the asteroid belt, approximately 5 kilometers in diameter. The asteroid was discovered on 16 October 1977, by Dutch astronomer couple Ingrid and Cornelis van Houten at Leiden, on photographic plates taken by Dutch–American astronomer Tom Gehrels at Palomar Observatory in California, United States. It was named after Belgian astronomer Eric W. Elst.

Orbit and classification 

Elst is a stony S-type asteroid and member of the Vesta family. It orbits the Sun in the inner main-belt at a distance of 2.1–2.7 AU once every 3 years and 9 months (1,382 days). Its orbit has an eccentricity of 0.13 and an inclination of 6° with respect to the ecliptic.

Physical characteristics

Lightcurve 

In August 2007, a rotational lightcurve of Elst was obtained from photometric observations by Czech astronomer Petr Pravec at Ondřejov Observatory. Lightcurve analysis gave a well-defined rotation period of 6.6322 hours with a brightness amplitude of 0.13 magnitude.

Diameter and albedo 

According to the survey carried out by NASA's Wide-field Infrared Survey Explorer with its subsequent NEOWISE mission, Elst measures 4.593 and 4.939 kilometers in diameter and its surface has an albedo of 0.4607 and 0.509, respectively, while the Collaborative Asteroid Lightcurve Link assumes a standard albedo for stony asteroids of 0.20 and consequently calculates a larger diameter of 7.46 kilometers based on an absolute magnitude of 13.0.

Survey designation 

The survey designation "T-3" stands for the third Palomar–Leiden Trojan survey, named after the fruitful collaboration of the Palomar and Leiden Observatory conducted in 1977. Gehrels used Palomar's Samuel Oschin telescope (also known as the 48-inch Schmidt Telescope), and shipped the photographic plates to Ingrid and Cornelis van Houten at Leiden Observatory where astrometry was carried out. The trio are credited with the discovery of several thousand minor planets.

Naming  
This minor planet was named in honor of Belgian astronomer Eric Walter Elst, one of the world's top discoverer of minor planets at Uccle Observatory in Belgium. The official naming citation was published by the Minor Planet Center on 28 April 1991.

Notes

References

External links 
 Asteroid Lightcurve Database (LCDB), query form (info )
 Dictionary of Minor Planet Names, Google books
 Asteroids and comets rotation curves, CdR – Observatoire de Genève, Raoul Behrend
 Discovery Circumstances: Numbered Minor Planets (1)-(5000) – Minor Planet Center
 
  
 

003936
2321
Discoveries by Cornelis Johannes van Houten
Discoveries by Ingrid van Houten-Groeneveld
Discoveries by Tom Gehrels
Named minor planets
19771016